Akiko Solon (born January 3, 1994, as Akiko Maria Leslie Villamor Solon) is a Filipino singer and actress. She joined Star Power: Sharon Search For the Next Female Superstar in 2010 and placed fifth in the contest. She is now currently under Star Magic.

Early life
A resident of Lapu-Lapu, Akiko started singing in school events when she was a fourth grader. Her first TV exposure was as a contestant for another ABS-CBN singing tilt for kids "Little Big Star, Cebu", hosted by Ms. Sheryn Regis. Because of the exposure she got in that contest, her alma mater EMD Carmelite School Foundation INC. gave their full support for her, she received a scholarship and when she graduated in high school, she already had her own album. She took up AB Masscom at the University of San Jose-Recoletos, and was the school's grand champion in its "Josenian Got Talent" contest last year.

Then, she joined Star Power: Sharon Search For the Next Female Superstar, dubbed as "Sweet and Sexy Siren of Cebu" and landed as the fifth placer of the said reality show.

Filmography

Television

References
 CRISPINA MARTINEZ-BELEN, "Getting to know the 'Star Power' Final 5", 
 Rodjun Cruz plots 'revenge'; Star Power contender Akiko Solon gets acting stint on Maalaala Mo Kaya 
 
 Vanessa A. Balbuena, "Akiko Solon: Cebuana makes it to "Star Power" final 5, shares lessons learned from the Megastar", 
 Rhea Manila Santos, Star Power's Akiko Solon gets her first acting role in the upcoming series 'Atom',
 Star Magic , 
 ABS-CBN, 

1994 births
Star Magic
Filipino child actresses
Filipino child singers
Participants in Philippine reality television series
Living people
People from Lapu-Lapu City
Singers from Cebu
Actresses from Cebu
University of San Jose–Recoletos alumni
21st-century Filipino singers